French Blood (original title: Un Français) is a 2015 French drama film written and directed by Diastème. It was selected to screen in the Platform section of the 2015 Toronto International Film Festival.

Cast 
 Alban Lenoir as Marco Lopez
 Samuel Jouy as Braguette
 Paul Hamy as Grand-Guy
 Olivier Chenille as Marvin
 Jeanne Rosa as Kiki
 Patrick Pineau as the pharmacist
 Lucie Debay as Corinne
 Blandine Pelissier as Marco's mother
 Frédéric Andrau as Police inspector
 Julien Honoré as Calou
 Andréa Brusque as Hermione
 Pierre-Benoist Varoclier as The drunk

Accolades

References

External links 
 

2015 films
2015 drama films
2010s French-language films
Films about race and ethnicity
Films about racism
French drama films
Films about neo-Nazism
2010s gang films
2010s French films